Frank Lehmann (born 29 April 1989) is a German professional footballer who plays as a goalkeeper for  club SV Elversberg.

Club career
Lehmann began his career with VfB Stuttgart, and made one appearance for the reserve team, on the last day of the 2007–08 season. He spent the next two seasons on loan with Eintracht Frankfurt and then Energie Cottbus, where he again played reserve team football, but he did make one appearance for the Cottbus first team in the 2. Bundesliga, as a substitute for Gerhard Tremmel on the last day of the 2009–10 season, in a 4–1 win over Rot-Weiss Ahlen.

In 2010, Lehmann signed for 1. FC Heidenheim of the 3. Liga. In his first season, he served as backup to Erol Sabanov, and made five appearances, but took over as first choice the following season. He lost his place to Sabanov again after 11 games of the 2012–13 season, and left the club in January 2013. After half a season without a club, he signed a one-year contract with VfL Osnabrück on 2 September 2013, which was later extended until 2016.

After four years with Osnabrück, Lehmann moved to Regionalliga Südwest club SV Elversberg on 2 August 2017.

International career
Lehmann gained two caps for the Germany U18 team, coming on for Mohamed Amsif in the first of two friendlies against Turkey U18 on 14 November 2006, and starting in the second tie on 16 November.

References

External links

1989 births
Living people
German footballers
Germany youth international footballers
VfB Stuttgart II players
Eintracht Frankfurt II players
FC Energie Cottbus II players
FC Energie Cottbus players
1. FC Heidenheim players
VfL Osnabrück players
SV Elversberg players
2. Bundesliga players
3. Liga players
Regionalliga players
Association football goalkeepers